These are the Top 100 singles of 1973 from Cash Box magazine

References
http://members.aol.com/_ht_a/randypny3/cashbox/1973.html
http://www.cashboxmagazine.com/archives/70s_files/1973.html
https://web.archive.org/web/20080101114734/http://musicseek.info/no1hits/1973.htm

See also
1973 in music
Hot 100 number-one hits of 1973 (USA) by Billboard magazine
RPM number-one hits of 1973 for the #1 hits in Canada

1973 record charts
1973
1973 in American music